Jackson Wan Kwong, born Lữ Minh Quang, is a singer from Hong Kong, nicknamed "the Temple Street Prince."

Wan was born in Cholon, Saigon in 1949 to a Cantonese Vietnamese family and was trained as a Cantonese opera singer. Wan left South Vietnam for British Hong Kong with his family as the Vietnam War heated up. From the 1960s to the 1980s, he switched to pop songs, whose lyrics, often in vulgar language, reflected the lives of the Hong Kong working class. Around the 1990s, he collaborated with other senior singers in Hong Kong, singing in pubs and on TV shows. He released an album called Ignoring Father (少理阿爸) in 2002 and still holds concerts occasionally.

Discography
 Hollywood Grand Hotel
 Counting Hair
 The Fortune Teller Tai Tset Sai (相士大隻西)
 Ignoring Father
 Chasing the Dragon

External links

References 

Cantopop artists
Hoa people
Vietnamese emigrants to Hong Kong
Hong Kong people of Hoa descent
Hong Kong male singers
Living people
1949 births
People from Ho Chi Minh City